Grand Theft Auto: San Andreas is a 2004 action-adventure game developed by Rockstar North and published by Rockstar Games. It is the fifth main entry in the Grand Theft Auto series, following 2002's Grand Theft Auto: Vice City, and the seventh installment overall. It was released in October 2004 for the PlayStation 2, in June 2005 for Microsoft Windows and Xbox, and in November 2010 for Mac OS X. The game is set within an open world environment that players can explore and interact with at their leisure. The story follows Carl "CJ" Johnson, who returns home following his mother's murder and is drawn back into his former gang and a life of crime while clashing with corrupt authorities and powerful criminals. Carl's journey takes him across the fictional U.S. state of San Andreas, which is based on California and Nevada and encompasses three major cities: Los Santos (inspired by Los Angeles), San Fierro (San Francisco) and Las Venturas (Las Vegas).

The game features references to many real-life elements of the world, such as its cities, regions, and landmarks, with its plot heavily based on several real-life events in Los Angeles in the early 1990s, including the rivalry between street gangs, the crack epidemic of the 1980s and early 1990s, the LAPD Rampart scandal, and the 1992 Los Angeles riots. San Andreas introduced gameplay elements that were incorporated in later games, including role-playing-style mechanics, customisation options with both clothing and vehicle appearances, a vast array of activities and mini-games, and the inclusion of gambling games.

Considered by many reviewers to be one of the greatest video games ever made, San Andreas received critical acclaim upon release, with praise directed at its music, story and gameplay, and criticism for its graphics and some aspects of its controls. It was the best-selling video game of 2004, and with over 27.5 million copies sold worldwide , it is the best-selling PlayStation 2 game and one of the best-selling video games of all time. Like its predecessors, San Andreas is cited as a landmark in video games for its far-reaching influence within the industry. The game's violence and sexual content was the source of much public concern and controversy. In particular, a player-made software patch, dubbed the "Hot Coffee mod", unlocked a previously hidden sexual scene, resulting in the game being re-rated AO by the North American Entertainment Software Rating Board (although its previous M rating was reinstated after the game was edited to remove the content). A remastered version of the game was released for Android and iOS in 2013, for Windows Phone, Fire OS and Xbox 360 in 2014, and for PlayStation 3 in 2015. In June 2018, the game was made available for the Xbox One via backward compatibility. An enhanced version with the subtitle The Definitive Edition was released in 2021, and a virtual reality version for Oculus Quest 2 is in development. The next main entry in the series, Grand Theft Auto IV, was released in April 2008.

Gameplay 

Grand Theft Auto: San Andreas is an action-adventure game with role-playing and stealth elements. Structured similarly to the previous two games in the series, the core gameplay consists of elements of third-person shooter and driving games, affording the player a large, open world environment in which to move around. On foot, the player's character is capable of walking, running, sprinting, swimming, climbing, and jumping as well as using weapons and various forms of hand-to-hand combat. The player can operate a variety of vehicles, including automobiles, buses, semis, boats, fixed-wing aircraft, helicopters, trains, tanks, motorcycles, and bicycles. The player may import vehicles in addition to stealing them.

The open, non-linear environment allows the player to explore and choose how they wish to play the game. Although storyline missions are necessary to progress through the game and unlock certain cities and content, the player can complete them at their leisure. When not taking on a storyline mission, the player can freely roam the cities and rural areas of San Andreas, eat in restaurants, or cause havoc by attacking people and causing destruction. Creating havoc can attract unwanted and potentially fatal attention from the authorities. The more chaos caused, the stronger the response: police will handle "minor" infractions (attacking pedestrians, pointing firearms at people, stealing vehicles, manslaughter, etc.), whereas SWAT teams, the FBI, and the military respond to higher wanted levels.

The player can partake in a variety of optional side missions that can boost their character's attributes or provide other sources of income. The traditional side missions of past Grand Theft Auto games are included, such as dropping off taxi cab passengers, putting out fires, driving injured people to the hospital, and fighting crime as a vigilante. New additions include burglary missions, pimping missions, truck and train driving missions requiring the player to make deliveries on time, and driving/flying/boating/biking schools, which help the player learn skills and techniques to use in their corresponding vehicles.

Not all locations are open to the player at the start of the game. Some locales, such as mod garages, restaurants, gyms, and shops, become available only after completing specific missions. Likewise, for the first portion of the game, only Los Santos and its immediate suburbs are available for exploration; unlocking the other cities and rural areas again requires the completion of specific missions. If the player travels to locked locations early in the game, they will attract the attention of SWAT teams, police, and police-controlled Hydras if in an aircraft.

Unlike its immediate predecessors Grand Theft Auto III and Vice City, which needed loading screens when the player moved between different districts of the city, San Andreas has no load times when the player is in transit. The only loading screens in the game are for cut-scenes and interiors. Other differences between San Andreas and its predecessors include the switch from single-player to multiplayer Rampage missions (albeit not in the PC and mobile versions), and the replacement of the "hidden packages" with spray paint tags, hidden camera shots, horseshoes, and oysters to discover.

The camera, fighting, and targeting controls were reworked to incorporate concepts from another Rockstar game, Manhunt, including various stealth elements, as well as improved target crosshairs and a target health indicator which changes from green to red to black as the target's health decreases. The PC version of the game implements mouse chording: the player has to hold the right mouse button to activate the crosshairs and then click or hold the left mouse button to shoot or use an item, such as a camera.

For the first time in the series, players can swim and climb walls. The ability to swim and dive underwater has a great effect on the player as well since water is no longer an impassable barrier that kills the player outright (although it is possible to drown). For greater firepower, the player can dual-wield firearms or perform a drive-by shooting with multiple gang members who can be recruited to follow the player. Due to the size of San Andreas, a waypoint reticule on the HUD map can be set, aiding the player in reaching a destination.

Role-playing game features in character development 
Rockstar emphasised the personalisation of the main protagonist by adding role-playing elements. Clothing, accessories, haircuts, jewellery, and tattoos are available for purchase by the player, and have more of an effect on non-player characters' reactions than the clothing in Vice City. CJ's level of respect among his fellow recruits and street friends varies according to his appearance and actions, as do his relationships with his girlfriends. The player must ensure that CJ eats to stay healthy and exercises adequately. The balance of food and physical activity affects his appearance and physical attributes.

San Andreas tracks acquired skills in areas such as driving, firearms handling, stamina, and lung capacity, which improve through use in the game. CJ may learn three different styles of hand-to-hand combat (boxing, kickboxing, and kung fu) at the gyms in each of the game's three cities if he is fit enough. CJ can either positively or negatively respond to most pedestrians' comments in the game. According to Rockstar, there are about 4,200 lines of spoken dialogue for CJ when the cutscenes are excluded.

Vehicles 
In total, there are 212 different vehicles in the game compared to approximately 60 in Grand Theft Auto III. New additions include bicycles, a combine harvester, a street sweeper, a jetpack, and trailers, amongst others. Car physics and features are similar to the Midnight Club series of street racing games, allowing for much more mid-air vehicle control as well as nitrous upgrades and aesthetic modifications.

There are several different classes of vehicles that serve different purposes. Off-road vehicles perform better in rough environments while racing cars perform better on tracks or the street. Jets are fast, but usually need a runway to land. Helicopters can land almost anywhere and are much easier to control in the air, but are slower. While previous Grand Theft Auto games had only a few aircraft that were difficult to access and fly, San Andreas has eleven different types of fixed-wing aircraft and nine helicopters and makes them more integral in the game's missions. There is also the ability to skydive from aircraft or from the tops of certain skyscrapers using a parachute. Several types of boats were added to the game, while some were highly modified.

Other additions and changes 
Other new features and changes from previous Grand Theft Auto games include:
 Gang wars: Battles with enemy gangs are prompted whenever the player ventures into enemy territory and kills at least three gang members. If the player then survives three waves of enemies, the territory will be won, and fellow gang members will begin wandering the streets of these areas. The more territory owned by the player, the more money that will be generated. Occasionally, the player's territory will come under attack from enemy gangs and defeating them will be necessary to retain these areas. Once all marked territories are claimed for the protagonist's gang from one of the two hostile gangs, the opposing gang can no longer attack. Once the player takes control of all territories from both rival gangs, none can come under attack.
 Car modification: Most automobiles in the game can be modified and upgraded at various garages. All car mods are strictly visual apart from the stereo system and nitrous oxide upgrade, which increases bass and gives the car a speed boost when activated, respectively; and hydraulics, which lowers the car's height by default and allows the player to control various aspects of the car's suspension. Other common modifications include paint jobs, rims, body kits, side skirts, bumpers, and spoilers.
 Burglary: Home invasion is included as a potential money-making activity. By stealing a burglary van, CJ can sneak into a residence at night and cart off valuables or shake down the occupants.
 Minigames: Numerous minigames are available for play in San Andreas, including basketball, pool, rhythm-based challenges (dancing and "bouncing" lowriders with hydraulics), poker, and video game machines that pay homage to classic arcade games. Also, there are the aforementioned casino games and methods of gambling, such as betting on virtual horse races.
 Money: The money system has been expanded upon, compared to previous games. Players can spend their cash on gambling, clothes, tattoos, meals, etc. Excessive gambling loss can force the player to sink into debt, which is shown in negative red numbers. When the player leaves a safehouse, CJ gets an unexpected call, and a mysterious person tells him about his debts. Four gang members suddenly appear and shoot Carl on sight if he does not erase the debt when the mysterious person calls him a second time.
 Multiplayer: Rampages have been modified to allow two players to complete them. The players are both shown simultaneously on the screen, meaning they must stay within proximity of each other. The multiplayer rampages provide such functionality.

Synopsis

Setting 
Grand Theft Auto: San Andreas takes place in 1992 within the fictional US state of San Andreas – based upon sections of California and Nevada as seen in the early 1990s – which consists of three main cities: Los Santos (based on Los Angeles), San Fierro (based on San Francisco), and Las Venturas (based on Las Vegas). Various regions of forest, desert, and small rural towns are scattered in between the major cities. Liberty City, the city featured in Grand Theft Auto III which is based on New York City, makes several minor appearances in the game, most notably during a mission which sees the player travelling there to assassinate a mob boss. The city itself is not explorable and only appears in cutscenes, with the entire mission taking place inside a bistro.

The game's setting forms part of the Grand Theft Auto series' "3D universe" canon, though unlike previous entries set in this continuity, San Andreas incorporates fictionalised versions of real-life landmarks and environments from the cities and US states it is based upon. It was the largest setting in the series until Grand Theft Auto Vs own depiction of San Andreas.

Characters 
Like the previous two Grand Theft Auto games, San Andreas features several Hollywood actors, musicians, and other celebrities as voice actors, in both main and minor roles. Many of them are West coast rappers, some of which, at the time of the game's release, were famous only in underground music communities and later turned more successful.

The player assumes the role of Carl "CJ" Johnson (voiced by Young Maylay), a veteran member of the Los Santos-based Grove Street Families street gang, who left for Liberty City five years prior in pursuit of a better life, but returns home following his mother's death. The gang is led by CJ's estranged older brother Sean/"Sweet" (Faizon Love), and includes his childhood friends Melvin "Big Smoke" Harris (Clifton Powell), Lance "Ryder" Wilson (MC Eiht), and aspiring rapper Jeffrey "OG Loc" Cross (Jas Anderson). Throughout the game, CJ befriends various characters that become important allies, including Cesar Vialpando (Clifton Collins Jr.), the leader of the Hispanic street gang Varrios Los Aztecas and the boyfriend of Carl's sister Kendl (Yo-Yo); hippie weed grower "The Truth" (Peter Fonda); tech genius and RC shop owner Zero (David Cross); blind Triad crime boss Wu Zi Mu/"Woozie" (James Yaegashi); government agent Mike Toreno (James Woods); crooked lawyer Ken Rosenberg (William Fichtner); criminally connected music producer Kent Paul (Danny Dyer); washed-up singer Maccer (Shaun Ryder); and renowned rapper Madd Dogg (Ice-T).

At the same time, Carl comes into conflict with a number of enemies, including the Ballas and Vagos street gangs; the highly corrupt C.R.A.S.H. police unit, consisting of Officers Frank Tenpenny (Samuel L. Jackson), Eddie Pulaski (Chris Penn), and Jimmy Hernandez (Armando Riesco); the Loco Syndicate drug cartel, headed by Toreno, pimp Jizzy B. (Charlie Murphy) and San Fierro Rifa street gang leader T-Bone Mendez (Kid Frost); and the Leone, Sindacco, and Forelli Mafia crime families. At various points in the storyline, CJ works with Cesar's criminal cousin Catalina (Cynthia Farrell), and mob boss Salvatore Leone (Frank Vincent), both previously featured in Grand Theft Auto III. Claude, the silent protagonist of Grand Theft Auto III, also makes a cameo appearance in the game, while Grand Theft Auto: Vice Citys protagonist Tommy Vercetti is mentioned.

Plot 
In 1992, following his mother's murder in a drive-by shooting, CJ returns home to Los Santos to attend her funeral. Upon arrival, he is intercepted by C.R.A.S.H. leaders Frank Tenpenny and Eddie Pulaski, who threaten to frame him for the recent murder of a police officer (actually killed by the duo for trying to expose their corruption) unless he co-operates with them. After leaving them, CJ reunites with Sweet, Kendl, Big Smoke, and Ryder at the funeral, and learns that the Grove Street Families have lost most of their influence and territories to their main rivals, the Ballas. CJ agrees to stay in Los Santos until the gang's problems are resolved, and works closely with his brother and friends to restore the Families' strength. During this time, he also befriends Varrios Los Aztecas gangster Cesar Vialpando after realizing he genuinely cares for Kendl, and helps to jumpstart OG Loc's rap career. Shortly after the Families' resurgence, Sweet plans to ambush a large group of Ballas. Before he can join the attack, CJ is contacted by Cesar with information on the drive-by shooting, revealing that C.R.A.S.H. ordered it with the intent of killing Sweet, and have been working with the Ballas, Big Smoke, and Ryder to end the Families and profit off the drug trade.

Realizing Sweet is headed into a trap, CJ attempts to save him, but both are arrested by the police. While Sweet is incarcerated, CJ is released on bail by C.R.A.S.H. and driven out of Los Santos, where he is forced to assist with several jobs to prevent C.R.A.S.H.'s corruption from going public. With the Families disbanded and the Ballas flooding Los Santos with drugs, CJ focuses on earning money to financially support himself, Kendl, and Cesar. He commits several robberies alongside Catalina and engages in illegal street racing. After winning a garage in San Fierro from Claude, CJ travels there with his associates and transforms it into a profitable business. While in San Fierro, CJ works for the local Triads after befriending Woozie, and infiltrates the Loco Syndicate, the Ballas' main cocaine supplier, to destroy them from the inside. After earning their trust, he kills the organization's leaders, as well as Ryder, and destroys their drug laboratory.

Later, CJ is surprised when Loco Syndicate leader Mike Toreno, who faked his death, contacts him for assistance, revealing himself to be a government agent. After carrying out several operations for Toreno in return for Sweet's release from prison, CJ travels to Las Venturas to help Woozie open a casino. Facing competition from the Mafia, CJ and the Triads organize a robbery of the rival mob-run casino. To gather intel on the place, CJ befriends Ken Rosenberg, the casino's manager, whom he eventually helps flee the city, and works for Salvatore Leone, who vows revenge after CJ robs his establishment. During this time, CJ continues to work for C.R.A.S.H., until Tenpenny betrays him and orders Pulaski to kill CJ and another C.R.A.S.H. member, Jimmy Hernandez, who was secretly exposing their corruption. After killing Hernandez, Pulaski is in turn killed by CJ. After saving Madd Dogg (who was driven to depression when CJ inadvertently ruined his career while helping OG Loc) from a suicide attempt, he approaches CJ to ask him to become his manager and help him rebuild his career. CJ returns to Los Santos and does so with his associates' help.

Toreno eventually honours his promise and allows CJ to be reunited with Sweet. Although happy to have him back, Sweet berates CJ for forgetting about their gang again, and talks him into helping to rebuild the Families. Meanwhile, Tenpenny is arrested for corruption, but is acquitted in his trial, provoking violent riots across Los Santos. CJ helps Madd Dogg exact revenge on OG Loc, and assists with retaking the Families' and the Varrios Los Aztecas' territories from the Ballas and Vagos. After tracking down Big Smoke at his fortress, CJ confronts and kills him over his betrayal. Tenpenny arrives to claim his share of Smoke's money and kill CJ, but the latter survives and pursues Tenpenny with Sweet's help. The brothers' pursuit eventually causes Tenpenny to crash his getaway vehicle in outside CJ's family home, where he dies from his injuries. With the riots eventually over and the Families restored, CJ and his allies celebrate their success in his home. In the midst of the celebrations, CJ leaves to check things out around the neighbourhood.

Development 

Rockstar North started the development of San Andreas right after the release of Grand Theft Auto: Vice City, at the end of 2002. Unlike its predecessor, which took nine months to produce, San Andreas had an extra year, therefore having an estimated development time of one year and nine months. The art director Aaron Garbut declared that the process of creation of Vice City was "very intense" and "short" and continued by stating: "We didn't have the luxury of a lot of time to take stock. It was very much a case of knowing what we had to do and doing it to the best of our abilities. This time around the extra year gave us that opportunity." Executive producer Sam Houser said that the members of the team "put an enormous amount of pressure" on themselves to ensure that they would "do everything possible to exceed people's expectations" with San Andreas. Some developers were worried about the working conditions imposed by Rockstar during the development of San Andreas since they could not take an adequate break after the completion of Vice City. Rockstar's long-time programmer, Gary Foreman, feared that the company had entered an "eternal crunch", as some developers had working hours reaching 17 hours per day. In addition, some developers had disagreements with Sam Houser, which caused them to step away from the game's production.

According to a report by The Wall Street Journal, San Andreas was Rockstar North's most expensive game at the time of its release, with an estimated budget of 10 million dollars, surpassing Vice Citys budget of 5 million. Rockstar Games was developing the game The Warriors; initially planned to release in 2004, The Warriors was delayed for 2005 in order to contribute further to the development of San Andreas and use additional resources for the game. During development, Rockstar North's president, Leslie Benzies, hoped that San Andreas would redefine the Grand Theft Auto series and "revolutionize open-ended gameplay and video game production values."

Ambience and searches

The game's events happen at the start of the 1990s in the fictional state San Andreas, inspired by the states of California and Nevada in the United States. Unlike its two predecessors, which were inspired by just one city, this game has three metropolises: Los Santos, San Fierro and Las Venturas, based on Los Angeles, San Francisco and Las Vegas, respectively, and the map is three times bigger than the one seen in Vice City. San Andreas had already appeared on the first Grand Theft Auto (1997). However, it was displayed only as a two-dimensional version of San Francisco. Garbut said that he did not want the game to be "big for the sake of it" and that he and his team at Rockstar "could have made Grand Theft Auto 3 or Vice City much bigger and simply repeated the same stuff for miles on end, padding out what we had, but no one wants to drive through miles of identical buildings." The goal of the team and Garbut with the game world was to create "depth" in the game's exploration, making each city seem different with each other, even though they belong in the same scenario. He commented: "I want to feel like I can stop at any point and discover new things, I want to feel I can climb onto any roof, I want to get to know the map and recognise where I am". Co-writer Dan Houser noted the development team's effort not to make each metropole seem "toy-towny" or something "square" and opined that the game had "really good gameplay built naturally into the environment."

Rockstar's team did long searches to replicate the different cities in the game. All development members were equipped with a camera in each city where the game is based on, taking photos of various locations. Garbut described the experience: "We had a huge road trip, driving across the States in a convoy of Lincoln Town Cars... stopping off in each city and staying there till we had pretty much photographed every inch. It really was epic. The bravest of us were taken in smaller groups into the scarier areas, right into the heart of LA's gang territory." Dan Houser commented that a group of searchers and artists took photos of every neighbourhood of Beverly Hills, California, and "the nicest casinos" of Las Vegas, besides other more peripheral regions in Los Angeles, as reported by Eurogamer: "[they visited] every trainers-over-the-telegraph-wire ghetto cesspit with couches in the streets and gangbangers cruising past in low-riders, and everywhere in between". Various neighbourhoods, bridges and explorable interiors of the game were based on actual locations of each city. For example, urban extensions in Los Santos had inspirations from Compton, California; a red bridge in the map's northwest of San Fierro was inspired by the famous Golden Gate Bridge; the casinos of Las Venturas were influenced by casinos in Las Vegas and have a role in the game's plot. As Dan Houser states, Rockstar planned to build an atmosphere with many perspectives to ensure that the game's missions would "show off all the best assets of the map."

Some players found the maps in Vice City too flat. Dan Houser agreed: "For good driving, one of the things that we missed was hills. It just adds that third dimension; it's not as fun with out." Regarding the game's mountain, the Mount Chiliad, Dan Houser stated: "One of the things that the countryside gives you is a mountain, you've never had a mountain in a GTA game before. The idea of being able to drive from LA, through the countryside, up a mountain and into San Francisco and on to Vegas is just freakish, and it feels amazing!" Garbut expressed satisfaction with the presence of hills, forests and a desert, which weren't in the previous installments: "I love the countryside [of the game]. It feels so refreshing to drive out of the city into rolling fields, past farms and rivers, into the forests, deserts and hills. The mountain is fantastic – it’s nearly half a mile [800 meters] tall and it takes just under a minute to fly from its base to the top in a helicopter... and a good deal longer to cycle down." Garbut said that he and the developers used many procedural techniques in grass and plants to give life to the mountain and the field: "There's so much to see. I really don't think any game has achieved this level of scale before while keeping anything like this level of detail. There's a sense of scale in this game that dwarfs the previous two while actually adding to the variety and detail."

Inspirations for the narrative

While writing the plot, Rockstar was inspired by events that occurred in the early '90s. The rivalry between the street gangs Bloods and Crips were used as the inspiration for the rivalry between the Grove Street Families and the Ballas—the main gangs of the game—respectively. Sam Houser recounted his fascination with the appearance and the gang members' clothing and his wish to represent it in San Andreas: "Well, what's after Miami in the '80s? Well, of course, the Bloods and the Crips and the LA early-'90s gang-banger culture. I remember being in the UK at the time it was going off and being completely fascinated and terrified by it. Fascinated by how they looked - they dress amazingly - but these guys are all like soldiers, and are treated like armies, and this is very serious, scary stuff." According to Dan Houser, the team was focused on not making San Andreas a game simply about gangs and wanted to connect all the narrative elements while still making sense. DJ Pooh, known at the time for being the co-writer of Friday (1995), was hired to co-write the game in order to detach the Britannic perspective on Los Angeles gang culture from the script, since Rockstar North was mostly composed of United Kingdom residents. DJ Pooh commented on the script's perspective: "One thing that makes me slightly nervous is the notion that it's a game about gang-banging, which it is not really". In the game's advertising, the Grove Street Families were referred to as Orange Grove Families. The game portrays the crack epidemic, which was the rise of drug use in the major cities in the U.S. between the start of the '80s and the start of the '90s, having an impactful role in the narrative.

Real-life events that involved police officers also inspired the events in San Andreas. The Rampart scandal of the Los Angeles Police Department, which concerned various cases of police corruption in the Community Resources Against Street Hoodlums anti-gang unit at the end of the '90s, was one inspiration. Another one involved a tumultuous manifestation, the 1992 Los Angeles riots, when a jury absolved Los Angeles police officers, three white and a Hispanic, accused of aggression against Black driver Rodney King after a high-speed chase.

For the writing of the game's narrative, Rockstar got influences from Hollywood films with varied aspects of the story and characters. Dan Houser describes that the team watched "hundreds of movies to get the California vibe into the game", while Garbut says he and the team had always been interested in "any relevant films". One of these inspirations came from the film Boyz n the Hood (1991), with references to the gangster style from the '90s. The presentation of gang rivalries in Menace II Society (1993) and Colors (1988) influenced the portrayal of gangs of Los Santos. Sean Penn, brother of Eddie Pulaski's voice actor Chris Penn, is one of the main characters of Colors. The action movies Con Air (1997) and Terminator 2 (1991) are referenced in the "Reuniting the Families" mission, when CJ tries to save his older brother Sweet in a motel while being chased by the police. Other influences and similarities come from movies such as New Jack City (1991) and Juice (1992).

Marketing and release

The Introduction short film 
As part of the Grand Theft Auto: San Andreas Special Edition re-release for the PlayStation 2 and the Grand Theft Auto: San Andreas Official Soundtrack, a DVD was provided containing a short 26-minute long film made through San Andreas game engine. The film, titled The Introduction, incorporates locations from both the game and Grand Theft Auto III, and focuses on events that take place before the start of the main story, providing insight into various characters from San Andreas prior to CJ meeting or reuniting with them. Most key plot details from the game are explained in this film, such as the downfall of the Grove Street Families; Big Smoke and Ryder's betrayal of the gang and alliances with C.R.A.S.H., the Ballas, and the Loco Syndicate; CJ's life in Liberty City; C.R.A.S.H.'s murder of Officer Ralph Pendelbury; Kent Paul and Maccer's arrival in San Andreas for a concert tour; the circumstances surrounding the construction of the Mafia's casino in Las Venturas; and the fateful drive-by shooting that kills CJ's mother Beverly and determines him to return to Los Santos.

Alongside the short film, the DVD also included a live-action documentary on the custom car culture (featured prominently in the game) called Sunday Drive.

Soundtrack 

As with the previous two entries in the Grand Theft Auto series, San Andreas has music taken from the time in which the game is based.

San Andreas is serviced by eleven radio stations; WCTR (talk radio), Master Sounds 98.3 (rare groove, playing many of the old funk and soul tracks sampled by 1980s and '90s hip-hop artists), K-Jah West (dub and reggae; modelled after K-Jah from Grand Theft Auto III), CSR (new jack swing, modern soul), Radio X (alternative rock, metal and grunge), Radio Los Santos (gangsta rap), SF-UR (house music), Bounce FM (funk), K-DST (classic rock), K-Rose (country) and Playback FM (classic hip hop).

The music system in San Andreas is enhanced from previous games. In earlier games in the series, each radio station was mainly a single looped sound file, playing the same songs, announcements and advertisements in the same order each time. In San Andreas, each section is held separately, and "mixed" randomly, allowing songs to be played in different orders, announcements to songs to be different each time, and plot events to be mentioned on the stations. This system would be used in Grand Theft Auto IV. WCTR, rather than featuring licensed music and DJs, features spoken word performances by actors such as Andy Dick performing as talk show hosts and listener callers in a parody of talk radio programming.

Lazlow again plays as himself on the show "Entertaining America" on WCTR in the same persona as in III and Vice City. He takes over after the former presenter, Billy Dexter, is shot on air by in-game film star Jack Howitzer. Lazlow interviews guests such as O.G. Loc, who is one of the four characters Carl encounters during the game that is on the radio, along with Big Smoke, Madd Dogg, and The Truth.

The Xbox, iOS, and Windows versions of the game include an additional radio station that supports custom soundtracks by playing user imported MP3s, allowing players to listen to their music while playing the game. This feature is not available on the PlayStation 2 version of the game or when played on the Xbox 360.

Reception 

Upon its release, Grand Theft Auto: San Andreas was met with critical acclaim. It received an average review score of 95/100, according to review aggregator Metacritic, tying for the fifth-highest ranked game in PlayStation 2 history. IGN rated the game a 9.9/10 (the highest score it has ever awarded to a PlayStation 2 game), calling it "the defining piece of software" for the PlayStation 2. GameSpot rated the game 9.6/10, giving it an Editor's Choice award. Jeff Gerstmann said "San Andreas definitely lives up to the Grand Theft Auto name. In fact, it's arguably the best game in the series." San Andreas also received an A rating from the 1UP.com network and a 10/10 score from Official U.S. PlayStation Magazine. Common praises were made about the game's open-endedness, the size of the state of San Andreas, and the engaging storyline and voice acting. Most criticisms of the game stemmed from graphical mishaps, poor character models, and low-resolution textures, as well as various control issues, particularly with auto-aiming at enemies. Some critics commented that while much new content had been added to San Andreas, little of it had been refined or implemented well.

Since its release, San Andreas has been regarded as one of the greatest games of all time, placing at number 27 in Edge Top 100 Games to Play Today. Edge declared that the game remains "the ultimate expression of freedom, before next-gen reined it all back in". In 2015, the game placed 8th on USgamer's The 15 Best Games Since 2000 list.

Sales and commercial success 
Grand Theft Auto: San Andreas sold  units within six days of release in the United States. In the United Kingdom, it sold an estimated 677,000 copies and grossed about  within two days, and sold over  copies in nine days. The game generated $235 million in revenue in its first week.

By March 2005, the game had sold over 12 million units for the PlayStation 2 alone, making it the highest-selling game for PlayStation 2. The game received a "Diamond" sales award from the Entertainment and Leisure Software Publishers Association (ELSPA), indicating sales of at least 1 million copies in the United Kingdom. As of 26 March 2008, Grand Theft Auto: San Andreas had sold 21.5 million units, according to Take-Two Interactive. The Guinness World Records 2009 Gamer's Edition lists it as the most successful PlayStation 2 game, with 17.33 million copies sold for that console alone from the total of 21.5 million in all formats. In 2011, Kotaku reported that, according to Rockstar Games, Grand Theft Auto: San Andreas had sold 27.5 million copies worldwide.

Controversies 
San Andreas was criticised by some for its perceived racial stereotyping. Some saw the alleged stereotyping as ironic, while others defended the game, noting that the storyline could speak to people of different backgrounds. A study of how different groups of youths engaged with the game found that "they do not passively receive the games' images and content".

Hot Coffee mod 

In mid-June 2005, a software patch for the game dubbed "Hot Coffee" was released by Patrick Wildenborg (under the Internet alias "PatrickW"), a 38-year-old modder from the Netherlands. The name "Hot Coffee" refers to the way the unmodified game alludes to unseen sex scenes. In the original version of the game, the player takes CJ's girlfriend to her front door, and she asks him if he would like to come in for "some coffee". He agrees, and the camera stays outside, swaying back and forth a bit, while moaning sounds are heard. After installing the patch, users can enter the main character's girlfriends' houses and engage in a crudely rendered, fully clothed sexual intercourse mini-game. The fallout from the controversy resulted in a public response from high-ranking politicians in the United States and elsewhere and resulted in the game's recall and re-release.

On 20 July 2005, the ESRB, which establishes content ratings for games sold in North America, changed the rating of the game from Mature (M) to Adults Only (AO), making San Andreas the only mass-released AO console game in the United States. Rockstar subsequently announced that it would cease production of the version of the game that included the controversial content. Rockstar gave distributors the option of applying an Adults Only ESRB rating sticker to copies of the game or returning them to be replaced by versions without the Hot Coffee content. Many retailers pulled the game off their shelves in compliance with their store regulations that kept them from selling AO-rated games. That same month in Australia, the Office of Film and Literature Classification revoked its initial rating of MA15+, meaning that the game could no longer be sold in the country.

In August 2005, Rockstar North released an official "Cold Coffee" patch for the PC version of the game and re-released San Andreas with the "Hot Coffee" scenes removed (Grand Theft Auto: San Andreas Version 2.0), allowing the game's earlier M rating to be reinstated. The PlayStation 2 and Xbox versions have also been re-released with the "Hot Coffee" scenes removed in the Greatest Hits Edition, the Platinum Edition, and the "Grand Theft Auto Trilogy Pack".

On 8 November 2007, Take-Two announced a proposed settlement to the class-action litigation that had been brought against them following the Hot Coffee controversy. If the court approved the proposed settlement, neither Take-Two nor Rockstar would admit liability or wrongdoing. Consumers would be able to swap their AO-rated copies of the game for M-rated versions and may also qualify for a $35 cash payment upon signing a sworn statement. A report in The New York Times on 25 June 2008 revealed that a total of 2,676 claims for the compensation package had been filed.

Sequels 
Following the success of San Andreas, Rockstar followed it up with two handheld games by Rockstar Leeds — Grand Theft Auto: Liberty City Stories, set in the late 1990s, and Grand Theft Auto: Vice City Stories in the mid 1980s. Both were developed for the PlayStation Portable handheld, and designed as prequels to Grand Theft Auto III and Vice City respectively, though eliminating some elements introduced in San Andreas, such as the need to eat and exercise, and swimming (although Vice City Stories re-introduced it, but in a limited capacity). The series would continue with 2008's Grand Theft Auto IV, and 2013's Grand Theft Auto V.

Legacy

San Andreas marked the technological pinnacle of the 3D era of Grand Theft Auto, although the development team believed that the design of its setting, incorporating three cities based on their real-life counterparts, had been too ambitious and did not allow the real-life locations to be emulated properly. Although the continuity of the setting would be retained in the handheld-focused spin-offs, Rockstar began establishing a new continuity for the series with the advent of the seventh-generation consoles, focused more on realism and details, including a full emulation of real-life cities used in settings, though with a scaled-back list of celebrity voice actors that had been prominent in the previous continuity. The launch of Grand Theft Auto IV led to Rockstar redesigning the setting of Liberty City, with the third incarnation being more heavily based upon the real-life New York City - amongst the improvements made included more depth in the number of buildings used and the detail with each, and removing any dead spots or irrelevant spaces. When Ars Technica reviewed Grand Theft Auto IV, he noted that the "slight regression of the series from Grand Theft Auto: San Andreas" in terms of its setting was "surprising".

The focus on realism and depth was continued with Grand Theft Auto V, though aimed at providing a more expansive setting than Grand Theft Auto IV, with the development team re-designing Los Santos, a city in San Andreas, to fully emulate the real-life city of Los Angeles, thus creating a setting with a higher quality, and at a grander scale with the incorporation of countryside and desert areas. Houser elaborated that "to do a proper version of L.A., [...] the game has to give you a sense of that sprawl — if not completely replicate it", and thus deemed that dividing both the budget and workforce to create multiple cities would have detracted from the goal of emulating the real-life setting. Garbut felt that, in the PlayStation 2 era, the team did not have the technical capabilities to capture Los Angeles properly, resulting in the San Andreas rendition of Los Santos feeling like a "backdrop or a game level with pedestrians randomly milling about", effectively deeming San Andreas as a jumping-off point for Grand Theft Auto V with the newer generation of consoles. As Garbut explained, with the move to the PlayStation 3 and Xbox 360 hardware, "our processes and the fidelity of the world [had] evolved so much from San Andreas" that using it as a model would have been redundant.

Ports
Grand Theft Auto: San Andreas was made available on the digital distribution platform Steam in January 2008, and received a notable amount of updates after its launch. On 7 November 2014, an update caused controversy after 17 tracks from the soundtrack were removed due to expired licences. Other drawbacks of the update included removal of widescreen support (which was later fixed via another minor update), and certain regions being incompatible with older saves. Both old and new owners were affected by the update, unlike with Grand Theft Auto: Vice City, where only new owners were affected due to a similar update. Additionally, the game received native support for XInput-enabled gamepads and the removal of digital rights management software.

A port of San Andreas for select iOS devices was released on 12 December 2013. It was followed closely by ports to Android devices on 19 December 2013, Windows Phone devices on 27 January 2014, and Fire OS devices on 15 May 2014. The upgrades and enhancements from the original game include newly remastered graphics, consisting of dynamic and detailed shadows, greater draw distance, an enriched colour palette, plus enhanced character and car models.

In 2008, the original Xbox version was released on Xbox 360 as an emulated port, and part of the Xbox Originals line-up. However, in late 2014 it was removed from the Xbox Live Marketplace and replaced with a port of the mobile version on 26 October 2014, the game's tenth anniversary. It featured HD 720p resolution, enhanced draw distance, a checkpoint system, a new menu interface, and achievements. While it introduced many new features, around ten songs were removed from the HD version that were present in the original due to licensing issues, and numerous new bugs were introduced. A physical release followed on 30 June 2015 in North America and 17 July 2015 elsewhere, under the "Platinum Hits" banner ("Classics" in PAL regions).

San Andreas was first released on PlayStation 3 in December 2012 as an emulated PS2 Classic. This version was also removed in late 2014, leading to rumours of a PS3 HD release. However, this was not the case at the time, and the PS2 Classic later returned. In early November 2015, the game was re-rated by the ESRB for an upcoming PS3-native release. The HD version was released on 1 December 2015, replacing the PS2 Classic on the PlayStation Store, and on physical media, gaining instant "Greatest Hits" status in North America. There has also been a PlayStation 4 version released, though unlike the port for the PlayStation 3, it is the PlayStation 2 game running via emulation, although it still has trophies and some songs edited out due to licensing restrictions.

An enhanced version of San Andreas, subtitled The Definitive Edition was released alongside Grand Theft Auto III and Vice City for Microsoft Windows, Nintendo Switch, PlayStation 4, PlayStation 5, Xbox One, and Xbox Series X/S in 2021; versions for Android and iOS devices are also in development. The Definitive Edition replaced existing versions of the game on digital retailers. A virtual reality version of the game is in development for Oculus Quest 2.

Notes

References

External links 

 

 
2004 video games
Action-adventure games
Android (operating system) games
Cultural depictions of the Mafia
D.I.C.E. Award for Action Game of the Year winners
D.I.C.E. Award for Adventure Game of the Year winners
Golden Joystick Award for Game of the Year winners
Grove Street Games games
Interactive Achievement Award winners
IOS games
MacOS games
Meta Quest games
Multiplayer and single-player video games
Obscenity controversies in video games
Open-world video games
Organized crime video games
PlayStation 2 games
PlayStation Network games
RenderWare games
Rockstar Games games
Spike Video Game Awards Game of the Year winners
Take-Two Interactive games
Video games about the illegal drug trade
Video games developed in the United Kingdom
Video games featuring black protagonists
Video games produced by Dan Houser
Video games produced by Leslie Benzies
Video games set in 1992
Video games set in 1993
Video games set in the United States
Video games with custom soundtrack support
Video games written by Dan Houser
Windows games
Windows Phone games
Xbox 360 games
Xbox games
Xbox Originals games